Víctor Bravo Ahuja (20 February 1918 - 30 August 1990) was a Mexican politician and academician who served as Secretary of Public Education  in the administration of Luis Echeverría (1970–76), as Governor of Oaxaca (1968–70) and as Director General (1951–55) and then Rector (1955–58) of the Monterrey Institute of Technology (ITESM).

He was born into a family composed by Rodrigo Bravo Monsalve and Carmen Ahuja Beauregard and became one of the first four students to graduate with a bachelor's degree in Aeronautical Engineering from the National Polytechnic Institute. He interrupted his master's degree at the California Institute of Technology, served in the Mexican Air Force and completed his master's degree at the University of Michigan.

References

Mexican Secretaries of Education
Governors of Oaxaca
Academic staff of the Monterrey Institute of Technology and Higher Education
Academic staff of the Instituto Politécnico Nacional
Instituto Politécnico Nacional alumni
1918 births
1990 deaths
University of Michigan alumni